The 1911–12 Tennessee Volunteers basketball team represents the University of Tennessee during the 1911–12 college men's basketball season. The head coach was Zora G. Clevenger coaching the Volunteers in his first season. The Volunteers team captain was A. E. Leonhardt.

Schedule

|-

References

Tennessee Volunteers basketball seasons
Tennessee
Tennessee Volunteers
Tennessee Volunteers